This is a list of all the 189 known spells in the Book of the Dead, and what they are for.

1 - 19
1. For the day of burial. Often accompanied with a lavish vignette showing a funerary procession.
1B. Recitation for the day of burial.
6. A shabti spell. First attested as Spell 472 of the Coffin Texts. The text of the spell reads:

7. Protection from animals 
9. Identifies the owner with the god Horus, son of Osiris; and affirming that Osiris will triumph over his enemy Seth, and asks for the gods to open a path for him. In the Papyrus of Ani this spell reads:

15 A hymn to the sun-god. Not a standard text; any one of a number of hymns might be used.
16 Not a text but a large vignette depicting the sunrise, referring to the daily rebirth of Ra
17 A text about the nature of the creator-god Atum. This is one of the longest, most complex, and most frequently included spells; the text is often so obscure that it incorporates comments or glosses explaining the meaning of the words or offering alternatives. The purpose of this spell was to ensure the owner could demonstrate his knowledge of religious secrets if challenged in the afterlife. It is first known as Spell 335 of the Coffin Texts. Part of the spell, as found in the Papyrus of Ani, reads:

{{blockquote|All the evil which was on me has been removed.
What does that mean?
It means that I was cleansed on the day of my birth in the two great and noble marshes which are in Heracleopolis on the day when the common folk make offerings to the Great God who is therein.

What are they?
'Eternity' is the name of one; 'sea' is the name of the other. They are the Lake of Natron and the Lake of Maat.

Otherwise said: Eternity governs' is the name of one; 'Sea' is the name of the other.Otherwise said: '''Seed of Eternity' is the name of one; 'sea' is the name of the other. As for that Great God who is therein, he is Ra himself
 |Book of the Dead, spell 17.}}18 Often paired with Spell 1719 Enables the dead to wear a 'wreath of vindication', a floral garland bestowed after the completion of the Weighing of the Heart.

21–30: Preservation of the parts of being21 Concerned with the Opening of the Mouth ritual, which enabled the coffin to support life and take in nourishment.22 Concerned with the Opening of the Mouth ritual; opening the mouth to enable the deceased to speak out in the Weighing of the Heart judgement. The words include:23 Concerned with the Opening of the Mouth ritual. The words include:24 Secured some essential ability for the deceased.25 Caused the deceased to remember his name after death. The name was regarded as a vital part of being. It begins:26 Helped to preserve the dead person's heart, and the heart's role in re-unifying the dead person's body and soul. It is sometimes illustrated with a vignette showing the god Anubis handing the deceased their own heart.27 Guarding against the theft or corruption of the deceased's heart by a group of gods, called 'those who steal hearts', and preventing the heart from betraying its owner at the Weighing of the Heart ritual28 Guarding against the loss of the heart.29 Guarding against the loss of the heart.29A Guarding against the loss of the heart.29B Guarding against the loss of the heart, by means of a heart amulet. This spell is found in manuscripts and also inscribed on heart-shaped amulets buried with the dead. Reads "I am the benu, the soul of Ra, who guides gods to the Netherworld when they go forth. The souls on earth will do what they desire, and the soul of [the deceased] will go forth at his desire".30 A heart spell.30B An appeal to the heart not to betray its owner in the Weighing of the Heart ritual (later described in Spell 125. Often inscribed on heart scarab amulets as well as on a manuscript. This spell also claims to have been found by a Prince Hordjedef of the 4th Dynasty; perhaps unlikely as the spell is first attested many years later, in the Second Intermediate Period. The spell includes this section about its own provenance

The section imploring the heart reads:

31–53: Protection from peril
 31 To stop the dead being harmed by crocodiles in the afterlife.

 32 The deceased takes on the identity of Ra and drives back eight crocodiles with a spear.33 Protection against snakes: "O rerek-snake, take yourself off, for Geb protects me, get up, for you have eaten a mouse, which Ra detests, and you have chewed the bones of a putrid cat" This is the first of five spells which protect the deceased from falling victim to snakes in the afterlife.34 Protection against snakebite.35 Protection against being eaten by snakes.36 Protection against the apshai-insect: "Begone from me, O Crooked-lips! I am Khnum, Lord of Shen, who despatches the words of the gods to Ra, and I report affairs to their master."37 Protection against 'songstress snakes'.38 Protection against hostile animals.39 Protection against snakes.40 Protection against "him who swallowed a donkey", a snake who is shown eating a donkey.41 Prevents the deceased from being slaughtered by demonic servants of Osiris.42 Served the same purpose as 41, but also contains a list of all the essential parts of the body and their divine parallels.43 Prevents decapitation in the afterlife and identifies the deceased with Osiris. "I am a flame, the son of a flame, to whom was given his head after it had been cut off. the head of Osiris shall not be taken from him, and my head shall not be taken from me."44 For 'Not dying a second time in the realm of the dead'.45 To prevent putrefaction.46 To prevent perishing.47 To prevent the deceased's place being taken.50 To escape from the slaughter-place.53 Stops the dead from the fate of walking upside-down in the afterlife.

54–63: Empowering to breathe and drink54 Giving the deceased power over air or water 55 'For giving breath', that is allowing the deceased to breathe once more 56 Giving the deceased power over air or water 57 Giving the deceased the power to breathe air and to have power over water.58 Giving the deceased the power to breathe air and to have power over water.59 Giving the deceased the power to breathe in air and to have power over water. It is addressed to the sycomore fig tree, symbol of the sky-goddess Nut, and reads:60 Giving the deceased the power to breathe air and to have power. over water.61 'For not letting a man's soul be taken away.' 62 'For drinking water in the realm of the dead.' 63A 'For drinking water and not being burnt by fire.' 63B Prevents the owner from being scalded.

64–89: Coming Forth by Day65 For 'coming forth by day' and having power over enemies.68 For 'coming forth by day' and ensuring power. Part reads:71 For 'coming forth by day'.76 Enables transformation into any form desired. This is the first of a group of 'transformation spells', 76–88, which are about giving the deceased the power to take a number of different forms, enabling them to travel the world of the living during the day and returning to the underworld at night.89 Allowed the ba-spirit of the deceased to rejoin the deceased. Typically with a vignette showing the ba, represented as a bird with a human head, flying over a mummy. Reads:

98–112: Navigating the Underworld98–99 Allowed the deceased to use ferryboats in the Underworld.100–2 Regarding the deceased's journey on the barque of Ra.105 To satisfy the ka. The ka required offerings of food, water, natron, and incense; these were shown being supplied in the vignette to this spell. These offerings also help to cleanse the ka of any wrongdoing.108–9 Ensures the deceased knows the souls of West and East. 109 also refers to the paradisical 'Field of Reeds'.110 A depiction of the 'Field of Reeds', an afterlife in a land of plenty largely similar to the land of the living. Typically illustrated with a large vignette.112–6 Names of the souls of sacred locations in Egypt; Pe, Nekhen, Hermopolis, and Heliopolis.

125-6: Judgement125 This spell describes the Weighing of the Heart judgement ritual. The deceased is led by Anubis into the presence of Osiris, and there makes a 'negative confession', saying that he is innocent of a list of 42 crimes, in front of 42 judges. His heart is then weighed against a feather, representing truth, justice, and the goddess Ma'at. If he is innocent, he is led to Osiris; a demon called Ammut, the Devourer, stands by to eat the heart of the guilty.126 An additional judgement ritual, sometimes also depicted in the vignette to spell 125. The deceased approaches a lake of fire guarded by four baboons. If the deceased was evil, they would be burned by the flames; however, the blessed dead received nourishment from it.

127–137: Journeys in the Duat and on the Barque of Ra127 'Worshipping the gods of the caverns'; instructions on how to deal with supernatural entities who the deceased had to pass on his way. Part reads: "O you door-keepers who guard your portals, who swallow souls and who gulp down the corpses of the dead who pass you by when they are allotted to the House of Destruction... May you guide [the deceased], may you open the portals for him, may the earth open its caverns to him, may you make him triumphant over his enemies".129 Refers to the barque of Ra.130 Made the disparate parts of the deceased's being into an effective akh with an eternal ba. 130–136 (including 136A and 136B) all illustrate the journey of the deceased in the solar barque, and could be illustrated with the same vignette, perhaps indicating some repetition.134 'For making a spirit worthy'; a funerary spell, to be pronounced by the living, to help the deceased triumph over their enemies. Reads:137A Like Spell 30B, this spell was allegedly first said to have been found by Prince Horjedef of the 4th Dynasty.
 137B The birth-goddess Ipet drives off Set using a flaming torch.

144–150: Gates, caverns, mounds, and guardians144 Lists the names of the creatures serving as keeper, guard, and announcer at each of seven gates. their names are fairly terrifying, for instance "He who lives on snakes", or "Hippopotamus-faced, raging of power". By knowing these gates, the deceased can persuade them to let him through. To the guardians the deceased says:

If uttered correctly, this spell ensures "he will not be driven off or turned away at the portals of the Netherworld".145 An alternative form of 146.146 Describes twenty-one 'portals of the House of Osiris in the Field of Reeds', each with a deity and a door-keeper. The names and descriptions of these entities are more elaborate and just as terrifying as those in 144.147 A gate spell.148 'For making provision for a spirit in the realm of the dead'. This spell provided the names of the Bull of Heaven and his seven cows, providing an eternal supply of food and beer. Their names are:149 A lengthy spell which lists 14 mounds which the deceased would have to pass in the underworld. As with the gates of spells 144–7, these mounds are guarded by gods and monsters.150 Has no text, but is a pictorial summary of the mounds in the Underworld. However, in this spell there are 15 mounds, while in 149 there are only 14.

151–189: Amuletic and protective spells151 Regarding the protection of the deceased in their tomb. This spell consists of a very large illustration, made up of a number of smaller images and texts, many of which derive from the older Coffin Texts. The purpose of this spell is to collect together the magical aids which were required for a burial, and also to perpetuate the protective funerary rituals. Some of these texts were also used on coffins, or on mud bricks placed in niches in the walls of a high-status funeral chamber.153A and 153B both deal with the risk of being caught in a trap, a giant net which stretches between heaven and earth.154 'For not letting the corpse perish'; this spell describes the decomposition of the body, but assures the deceased that they will triumph over it.155 For a djed pillar amulet.156 For an Isis knot amulet.157 For an amuletic golden vulture collar.158 For an amuletic golden falcon collar.159 For a papyrus column amulet.160 For a papyrus column amulet.161 Describes how the four winds are released through openings in the sky to give the dead person the breath of life. Often combined with passages from spell 151162-74 These spells appear to have been composed during the Late Period182 A rare spell titled 'Book for the permanence of Osiris, giving breath to the inert One in the present of Thoth, and repelling the enemy of Osiris'. This spell invokes the power of Thoth in order to ensure the mummy of the deceased is protected by a large number of gods and spirits, who are similar in appearance to the fearsome guardians of the gates, caverns and mounds mentioned in earlier spells.185 A hymn to Osiris.189' For not eating faeces or drinking urine. 

References
 Notes 

 Bibliography 
Taylor, John H. (translator), Ancient Egyptian Book of the Dead: Journey through the afterlife''. British Museum Press, London, 2010. 

Egyptian mythology
 
2nd millennium BC in religion